Khomitsky is a Slavic masculine surname; its feminine counterpart is Khomitskaya. It may refer to:

 Sergey Khomitsky (born 1974), Belarusian boxer
 Vadim Khomitsky (born 1982), Russian ice hockey defenceman 

Russian-language surnames